Alma Martínez may refer to:

 Alma Martínez (footballer) (born 1981), Mexican footballer
 Alma Martinez (actress) (born 1953), American actress
 Alma Rosa Martínez (born 1951), Mexican Olympic sprinter